Mark Perego (born 8 February 1964 in Winchester, England) is a former Wales international rugby union player. A flanker, he played club rugby for Llanelli and attained 9 caps for the Wales national rugby union team.

Rugby
Perego made his Wales debut 3 March 1990 versus Scotland. He went on to be a key player in the Welsh championship-winning team of the 1994 Five Nations. 

His strengths as a player included his powerful tackling and his phenomenal fitness, the latter of which he maintained through a highly-effective, but eccentric, training regime. In a famous sequence, BBC Wales filmed him running through a river in a pink beret and chopping trees with an axe.

Perego's nickname was Oddball and he was featured in the 2009 book Rugby's Greatest Characters.

Personal life
Perego was a fireman by trade. He was previously married to Welsh international Non Evans and is the uncle of Welsh professional rugby union player Kirby Myhill.

References

External links
Wales profile

1964 births
Living people
Llanelli RFC players
Rugby union flankers
Rugby union players from Winchester
Wales international rugby union players
Welsh rugby union players